This table displays the top-rated primetime television series of the 1965–66 season as measured by Nielsen Media Research.

References

1965 in American television
1966 in American television
1965-related lists
1966-related lists
Lists of American television series